The 2013 Ironman 70.3 World Championship was a triathlon competition that was held at Lake Las Vegas in Henderson, Nevada on September 8, 2013. The event was won by German Sebastian Kienle and Australian Melissa Hauschildt. The championship was organized by the World Triathlon Corporation (WTC) and was the culmination of the Ironman 70.3 series of events that occurred from August 19, 2012 through August 11, 2013. Athletes, both professional and amateur, earned a spot in the championship race by qualifying in races throughout the 70.3 series.

This was the final year of the championship event being held in the Las Vegas area. In 2014, the championship race will begin changing locations each year. This is in contrast to having an annual recurring championship in one location as in the past with Las Vegas and Clearwater, Florida. The annual Las Vegas race will remain in place for 2014 but will be renamed the Ironman 70.3 Silverman.

Championship results

Men

Women

Qualification
The 2013 Ironman 70.3 Series featured 61 events that enabled qualification to the 2013 World Championship event. Professional triathletes qualified for the championship race by competing in races during the qualifying period, earning points towards their pro rankings. An athlete’s five highest scoring races were counted toward their pro rankings. The top 50 males and top 35 females in the pro rankings qualified for the championship race. Professional athletes were also eligible for prize purses at each qualifying event, which ranged in total size from $15,000 to $200,000.

Amateur triathletes could qualify for the championship race by earning a qualifying slot at one of the qualifying events. At qualifying events, slots were allocated to each age group category, male and female, with the number of slots given out based on that category's proportional representation of the overall field. Each age group category would be tentatively allocated one qualifying spot in each qualifying event. Some 70.3 events also served as qualifiers for the full Ironman World Championships in Hawaii.

Qualifying Ironman 70.3 events

†
‡

The Ironman 70.3 Switzerland race was canceled due to weather. The race was initially changed to a duathlon due to cold temperatures preventing the swim portion from taking place. However, rain in the region caused both a landslide and a falling tree to obstruct the bike course forcing race organizers to cancel the race entirely.

2013 Ironman 70.3 Series results

Men

*Swim canceled due to low air and water temperatures

Women

*Swim canceled due to low air and water temperatures

References

External links
Ironman 70.3 Series website 

Ironman World Championship
Ironman
Triathlon competitions in the United States
Sports competitions in Nevada
Ironman 70.3 World Championship